The Samsung Galaxy S series is a line of flagship Android smartphone and tablet computer produced by Samsung Electronics. Together with the foldable Galaxy Z series, the lineup serves as Samsung's flagship smartphone lineup.

The series consisted initially of smartphones and the first device, the Samsung Galaxy S, was announced in March 2010 and released for sale in June of that year. Samsung later expanded the Galaxy S line to tablet computers with the announcement of the Galaxy Tab S in June 2014 and released the next month. The Samsung Galaxy Tab series is the related tablet line.

Phones

Samsung Galaxy S 

The original Samsung Galaxy S smartphone was announced in March 2010 and released on 4 June 2010.

 Display: 4.0" Super AMOLED
 Resolution: 480x800 pixels
 Processor: Samsung Exynos 3
 Storage: 2-16 GB (expandable)
 RAM: 512 MB
 Battery: 1500 mAh (user-replaceable)
 Camera: Back: 5 megapixels, 1x, 720p (HD) video; Front: 0.3 megapixels
 Back cover is replaceable.
 Expandable storage: Micro SD Card (SD HC, up to 32 GB)
 Touch sensors for navigation keys; no dedicated camera shutter button

Samsung Galaxy S II 

The company announced the Samsung Galaxy S II on 13 February 2011.

 Display: 4.3" or 4.5" Super AMOLED
Resolution: 480x800 pixels
 Processor: Samsung Exynos 4 Dual, Texas Instruments OMAP4430, or Qualcomm Snapdragon S3 APQ8060
 Storage: 16/32GB (expandable)
 RAM: 1 GB
 Camera: Back: 8 Megapixels, 1x, 1080p (Full HD) video; Front: 2 megapixels; flash light added; located at center instead of corner
 Battery: 1650 or 1800 mAh (user-replaceable)
 Back cover is replaceable
 USB On-The-Go (OTG)
 Mobile High-definition Link (MHL) to HDMI
 External storage: MicroSD-HC Cards (up to 32GB)
Android 2.3.4,up to 4.1.2

In 2013, a "Plus" variant was released with only 8GB of internal storage and slightly different chipset. It also features the TouchWiz "Nature UX" user interface, and the brushed dark blue colour variant ("Pebble Blue"), both known from the Galaxy S III.

Samsung Galaxy S III 

The Samsung Galaxy S III was announced on 3 May 2012. More than 70 million units of the Galaxy S III were sold, making it the one of the most sold S series phone. It features a split-screen feature whereby users can use two apps simultaneously (available from Android 4.1 up to 4.4.2 "Premium Suite Upgrade"), an upgraded video player software which is first able to play in a movable and resizeable pop-up window for simultaneous watching during other tasks, and with motion thumbnails that can preview playing videos rather than only a static image, an "Ambient Light" feature whereby the screen brightness can automatically adjust to the light level, a "Smart Stay" feature that can prevent the phone's screen from turning off by looking at the phone, a personal assistant called S Voice, the ability to tag faces in the phone's gallery, an "S Beam" feature to transfer files via NFC, an LED light on the front of the phone that can be used for notifications, a "Motion Gestures" feature whereby users can accomplish tasks by moving the phone, color point effects for the camera, and "smart alert" – an optional haptic feedback notification which vibrates the unit when picked up to notify the user.

The Galaxy S III is the first Samsung mobile phone with wireless charging support that can be enabled using a special back cover that connects to dedicated pins under the rear cover.

Like its predecessor, its rear camera has eight megapixels (3264×2448) and 1080p video recording, though the S3 adds stereo audio recording, as well as the ability to simultaneously capture 6 megapixel (3264×1836) photos while filming, which is the image sensor's highest 16:9 aspect ratio crop. The front camera's video resolution has increased from 480p to 720p. No megapixel label is present like on the predecessor.

The "premium suite upgrade" delivered by Samsung through the update to Android 4.1 later the year retrofitted the split-screen feature from the Galaxy Note 2, allowing two apps on screen simultaneously.

 Display: 4.8" Super AMOLED
Resolution: 720x1280 pixels
 Processor: Samsung Exynos 4 Quad, Qualcomm Snapdragon S4 MSM8960, or Qualcomm Snapdragon 400 MSM8228
 Storage: 16/32/64GB (expandable with SD XC)
 RAM: 1GB (S3 GT-i9300); 1.5 GB (S3 Neo GT-i9301); 2GB (S3 LTE GT-i9305)
Camera: Back: 8 megapixels, 1x, 1080p (Full HD) video at 30 fps; Front: 1.9 megapixels 720p (HD) video at 30 fps
 Battery: 2100 mAh (user-replaceable)
 FM radio receiver (GT-i9300 only)

Samsung Galaxy S4 

The Samsung Galaxy S4 was announced by Samsung on 14 March 2013. More than 80 million units of the Galaxy S4 were sold, making it the one of the most sold S series phone.
With Android 4.2.2, current 5.0.2. 
New features that this model has compared to its predecessor include:
 an infrared blaster that allows the phone to be a universal remote control
 a "Smart Pause" feature that pauses videos when nobody is looking at the screen
 a "Smart Rotation" feature whereby the screen rotation blocks itself by detecting the user's face
 a "Smart Scroll" feature whereby webpages automatically scroll by tilting the head or device
 a "Story Album" feature
 a barometer to measure the altitude level
 the ability to measure the ambient temperature
 the ability to measure the ambient humidity percentage
 a one-handed mode (available via update)
 the ability to increase the sensitivity for usage with gloves
 an "Air View" feature that allows information to be shown by hovering the screen without touching it
 an "Air Gesture" feature" whereby users can control the device by moving the hand over the phone
 the option to adapt the phone to an optimal display and optimal sound
 the ability to take a photo and record up to nine seconds of sound
 the ability to take a fast-motion photo and make a repeat effect
 the ability to take a photo and animate it
 the ability to erase parts of a photo.
 the ability to capture photos and record video simultaneously from both rear and front cameras, though stored picture-in-picture rather than in separate video tracks within a file or separate files; the camera order can be swapped while recording.
 A "remote viewfinder" feature, where the camera viewfinder and controls can be cast to a different unit through Wi-Fi Direct.
 "Quick glance", which allows checking the clock, missed calls, messages, and notification bar without touching the phone, by hovering above the proximity sensor.

The Galaxy S4 is one of only two Samsung mobile phones to be equipped with thermometer and hygrometer sensors (the other being the Galaxy Note 3).

Some praised the innovation inherent in all of the Galaxy S4's new features, while others criticized it as feature creep.

The resolution of the main (rear) camera was increased to 13 megapixels, and it is able to capture 9.6 megapixel photographs during video recording at 1080p. The front camera has 2.1 megapixels and its video resolution was increased to 1080p. Optional location-based contextual file names can facilitate later browsing.

 Display: 5.0" Super AMOLED
Resolution: 1920x1080 pixels
 Processor: Samsung Exynos 5 Octa 5410 or Qualcomm Snapdragon 600
 Storage: 16 / 32 / 64 GB (expandable)
 RAM: 2 GB
Camera: Back: 13 megapixels, 1x, 3840x2160p (4K UHD) video at 30 fps; Front: 2.1 megapixels, 1080p (Full HD) video at 30 fps
 Battery: 2600 mAh (user-replaceable)
 Removed feature: FM radio

Its variants are the rugged and water-resistant S4 Active, the lower-priced mid-class S4 Mini, as well as the hybrid Samsung Galaxy S4 Zoom, which is equipped with an optical zoom lens with 10× magnification, more powerful Xenon flash, tripod mount, and rotary knob lens ring, combining a mobile phone with a dedicated digital camera.

Samsung Galaxy S5 

The Samsung Galaxy S5 was announced on 24 February 2014. It improves upon the Galaxy S4 by adding a heart rate monitor, IP67 water resistance, a fingerprint scanner, the ability to record 4K videos (2160p at 30fps) and 1080p at twice the frame rate (60 fps), phase-detection autofocus which is faster than previously used contrast detection, the ability to take better photos in low light levels, a "Download Booster" feature to increase download levels to the maximum bandwidth allowed, the ability to restrict the usage of battery by limiting the phone's usage, and USB 3.0. It lacks the thermometer (temperature) sensor, hygrometer (humidity) sensor, and "Story Album" features from the preceding Galaxy S4, but largely inherited Air View and gesture-related functionality. "Quick glance" was replaced with "Air wake-up", which allows waking up the smartphone from stand-by mode by hovering over the proximity sensor.

 Display: 5.1 Super AMOLED
Resolution: 1920x1080 pixels
 Processor: Samsung Exynos 5 Octa 5422, Qualcomm Snapdragon 801, or Qualcomm Snapdragon 805
 Storage: 16 / 32 GB (expandable)
 RAM: 2 / 3 GB
Camera: Back: 16 megapixels, 1x, 3840x2160p (4K UHD) video at 30 fps, 1080p (Full HD) at 60 fps or slow-motion 720p (HD)at 120 fps; Front: 2 megapixels, 1080p (Full HD) at 30 fps
 Battery: 2800 mAh (user-replaceable)

The Galaxy S5 is the first Samsung mobile phone where the touch key on the left side of the home button is a task key instead of an option key, and the last mobile phone in the Galaxy S series to be equipped with a user-replaceable battery.
The Galaxy S5 is the last mobile phone in the Galaxy S series with a micro-SIM card; later phones use a nano-SIM card.

Since the Galaxy S5, the model number (e.g.  SM-G900F) is no longer displayed on the boot screen.

Samsung Galaxy S6 

The Samsung Galaxy S6 series marks a counter-utilitarian and fashion-oriented course in the Galaxy S series. It consists of four phones: the Samsung Galaxy S6, the Samsung Galaxy S6 Edge, the Samsung Galaxy S6 Edge+ and the Samsung Galaxy S6 Active. Samsung first announced the Galaxy S6 and Galaxy S6 edge on 1 March 2015. On 13 August 2015, Samsung announced the Galaxy S6 edge+, along with the Galaxy Note5. The Galaxy S6 series improves upon its predecessors by adding the ability to quickly charge the phone with up to 15 watts using Qualcomm Quick Charge 2.0, virtual reality (compatible with the Galaxy Gear VR), a "Smart Manager" feature, and the ability to customize the interface with themes. It also features a new metal and glass build.

Feature removals
The Galaxy S6 series removes several features, including some long-term key features, from its predecessors, such as the microSD card slot, Mobile High-Definition Link (MHL) support, water protection, Air Gesture control, Air View, Smart Pause, Smart Rotation, Smart Scroll, the one-handed operation mode, increased sensitivity of the capacitive touch screen for use with gloves, and USB 3.0 support. In addition, the batteries in the Galaxy S6 and Galaxy S6 edge are smaller than the battery in the Galaxy S5, and are not replaceable by end users.

Justin Denison, then vice president of product strategy at Samsung, stated on stage at the Unpacked 2015 Episode 1 keynote event that they had opted for a built-in battery now that "consumers could feel confident in charging their phones". The previous year, a Samsung commercial for the Galaxy S5 had mocked the iPhones' non-replaceable batteries, referring to iPhone users as "wall huggers", citing their incessant dependence on wall charging.

Camera
It is the first main model phone to feature optical image stabilization on the rear camera and also improves upon it with the brighter 1.9 aperture that enables improved low-light performance for both photography and video recording, the first Samsung phone with a dedicated camera quick launcher (home button double-press) and also the first Samsung flagship device to capture slow motion video with audio and original framerate (120 frames per second) which can be edited in a precluded editor software accessible through the gallery software.

Other
The Galaxy S6 is the first mobile phone in the Galaxy S series with a nano-SIM card; earlier Galaxy phones use a micro-SIM card or "standard" (mini-SIM) card.

The S6 Edge Plus, being released simultaneously with the Galaxy Note 5, is not equipped with an infrared transmitter for use as a remote control.

 Display: 5.1" Super AMOLED (Galaxy S6 and Galaxy S6 edge); 5.7" Super AMOLED (Galaxy S6 edge+)
Resolution: 1440x2560 pixels
 Processor: Samsung Exynos 7 Octa 7420
 Storage: 32 / 64 / 128 GB
 RAM: 3 GB (Galaxy S6 and Galaxy S6 edge); 4 GB (Galaxy S6 edge+)
Camera: Back: 16 megapixels, 1x, 3840x2160p (4K UHD) video at 30 fps, 1080p (Full HD) at 30/60 fps or slow-motion 720p (HD) at 120 fps; Front: 5 megapixels, 1440p (QHD) at 30 fps
 Battery: 2550 mAh (Galaxy S6); 2600 mAh (Galaxy S6 edge); 3000 mAh (Galaxy S6 edge+), 3500 mAh (Galaxy S6 Active) (non-replaceable)

Samsung Galaxy S7 

The Samsung Galaxy S7 series, which consists of the Samsung Galaxy S7, the Samsung Galaxy S7 edge and the Samsung Galaxy S7 Active, was announced on 21 February 2016. They improve upon the Galaxy S6 by adding an always-on display to optionally show information while the screen is off, a "Dual Pixel" camera feature for faster autofocus,  and improved low-light photography.

Water resistance and a microSD card reader were added back, both of which had been present on the Galaxy S5, and the latter also on all earlier iterations of the Galaxy S line, but neither present on the Galaxy S6. However, the IR blaster was removed from the Galaxy S7. A single-handed operation mode was added back after removal on the S6, but without on-screen buttons and shortcuts present on the S5.

Camera
The camera in the Galaxy S7 has 12 megapixels, down from the Galaxy S6's 16 megapixels to achieve a larger pixel size on the image sensor, enabling it to capture more light under the same conditions.

Its rear camera aperture of 1.7 was the then brightest aperture on any mobile phone camera.
Its front camera, although having the same resolution as the Galaxy S6's one (2592×1944 photo; 2560×1440p video), has a brighter 1.7 aperture as well, compared to the 1.9 on the Galaxy S6.

The five-minute time limitation for 2160p video present in preceding devices has been removed.

StorageIn the United States and some European markets, only the lowest storage option of 32 GB was shipped, meaning that the internal storage capacity has only doubled in the seven years since the 2009 Samsung i8000 Omnia II flagship which available with up to 16 GB.

 Display: 5.1" Super AMOLED (Galaxy S7); 5.5" Super AMOLED (Galaxy S7 edge)
Resolution: 1440x2560
 Processor: Samsung Exynos 8890 or Qualcomm Snapdragon 820
 Storage: 32 / 64 / 128 GB (expandable)
 RAM: 4 GB
Camera: Back: 12 megapixels, 1x, 3840x2160p (4K UHD) video at 30 fps, 1080p (Full HD) at 30/60 fps or slow-motion 720p (HD) at 240 fps; Front: 5 megapixels, 1440p (QHD) at 30 fps
 Battery: 3000 mAh (Galaxy S7); 3600 mAh (Galaxy S7 edge) (non-replaceable)

Samsung Galaxy S8 

Samsung announced the Samsung Galaxy S8 and Samsung Galaxy S8+ smartphones on 27 March 2017. They feature an iris scanner, which was not present on the Galaxy S7 phones. S Voice has also been replaced by Bixby. In addition, the microUSB port has been replaced by a USB-C 3.0 port, and the physical home button and capacitive buttons have been replaced by on-screen keys. All previous galaxy S series smartphones featured a 16:9 aspect ratio which was changed on the Galaxy S8 for the first time. A new feature called Samsung DeX was added, allowing the phone to get a desktop user interface when plugged in a monitor.

 Display: 5.8" Super AMOLED (Galaxy S8); 6.2" Super AMOLED (Galaxy S8+), 18.5:9 aspect ratio
Resolution: 1440x2960
 Processor: Samsung Exynos 8895 or Qualcomm Snapdragon 835
 Storage: 64 GB (expandable)
 RAM: 4 GB
Camera: Back: 12 megapixels, 1x, 3840x2160p (4K UHD) video at 30 fps, 1080p (Full HD) at 30/60 fps or slow-motion 720p (HD) at 240 fps; Front: 8 megapixels, 1440p (QHD) at 30 fps
 Battery: 3000 mAh (Galaxy S8); 3500 mAh (Galaxy S8+) (non-replaceable)

Samsung Galaxy S9 

The Samsung Galaxy S9 and Samsung Galaxy S9+ were unveiled on 25 February 2018 at the Mobile World Congress, with an improved camera, redesigned back panel and improved internals. The fingerprint scanner on the back is relocated to below the rear-facing camera, and the earpiece becomes an additional speaker for stereo sound.

The Galaxy S9 is the first flagship phone by Samsung to support recording 2160p (4K) at 60 frames per second (twice as much as the preceding Galaxy S5 to S8), 1080p at 240 frames per second (four times as much as the S5 to S8) and super slow motion at 960 frames per second for a limited duration. The first two frame rates are the first increase in the series since the 2014 Samsung Galaxy S5.

Its camera has a variable aperture which can switch between 1.5 and 2.4, making it the first mobile phone since the 2009 Nokia N86 with a variable aperture camera. A subsequent software update retrofitted the feature of warning the user about flaws in photographs such as blinking eyes and blur, which was first implemented on the Galaxy Note 9.

 Display: 5.8" Super AMOLED (Galaxy S9); 6.2" Super AMOLED (Galaxy S9+), 18.5:9 aspect ratio
Resolution: 1440x2960 pixels
 Processor: Samsung Exynos 9810 or Qualcomm Snapdragon 845
 Storage: 64 / 128 / 256 GB (expandable)
 RAM: 4 GB (Galaxy S9), 6 GB (Galaxy S9+)
Camera: (Galaxy S9) Back: 12 megapixels, 1x, 3840x2160p (4K UHD) video at 30/60 fps, 1080p (Full HD) at 30/60 fps, slow-motion 1080p at 240 fps or slow-motion 720p (HD) at 960 fps; Front: 8 megapixels, 1440p (QHD) at 30 fps. (Galaxy S9+) Back: 12 megapixels (wide), 1x, 12 megapixels (telephoto), 2x; 3840x2160p (4K UHD) video at 30/60 fps, 1080p (Full HD) at 30/60 fps, slow-motion 1080p at 240 fps or slow-motion 720p (HD) at 960 fps; Front: 8 megapixels, 1440p (QHD) at 30 fps
 Battery: 3000 mAh (Galaxy S9); 3500 mAh (Galaxy S9+) (non-replaceable)

Samsung Galaxy S10 

Samsung announced the Samsung Galaxy S10 series, consisting of the Samsung Galaxy S10e, Samsung Galaxy S10, Samsung Galaxy S10+ and Samsung Galaxy S10 5G On 20 February 2019 to commemorate the 10th Anniversary of the S Series lineup . The Galaxy S10 series introduced many new features such as an ultrasonic in-display fingerprint scanner, ultra wide lens, reverse wireless charging, 5G and Samsung's first hole-punch selfie camera design. The Galaxy S10 series debuted the One UI software for the first time with Android 9 Pie. In January 2020, the Galaxy S10 Lite was released, a mid-range variant of the S10 containing the same cameras and performance but with lower features. The aspect ratio was changed again on the Galaxy S10 series from the Galaxy S8 series. The galaxy S10 Lite featured a 20:9 aspect ratio differing from the rest of the Galaxy S10 series.

The charging rates above 15 watts supported by the S10 5G and S10 Lite are the first increase on Samsung flagship smartphones since the 2014 Samsung Galaxy Note 4.

Samsung Galaxy S10e
 Display: 5.8" Dynamic AMOLED, 19:9 aspect ratio
 Resolution: 2280×1080 pixels
 Processor: Samsung Exynos 9820 or Qualcomm Snapdragon 855
 Storage: 128 / 256 GB (expandable)
 RAM: 6 / 8 GB
Camera: Back: 12 megapixels (wide), 1x, 16 megapixels (ultra wide), 0.5x; 3840x2160p (4K UHD) video at 30/60 fps, 1080p (Full HD) at 30/60 fps, slow-motion 1080p at 240 fps or slow-motion 720p (HD) at 960 fps; Front: 10 megapixels, 3840x2160p (4K UHD) at 30/60 fps, 1080p (Full HD) at 30 fps
 Battery: 3,100 mAh (non-replaceable)
 Introduced Features: Side-mounted Fingerprint Sensor, Dual Rear Cameras, Infinity-O Display, HDR10+ Video Recording, Reverse Wireless Charging (Qi-certified), Wi-fi 6

Samsung Galaxy S10
 Display: 6.1" Dynamic AMOLED, 19:9 aspect ratio
 Resolution: 3040×1440 pixels
 Processor: Samsung Exynos 9820 or Qualcomm Snapdragon 855
 Storage: 128 / 512 GB (expandable)
 RAM: 8 GB
Camera: Back: 12 megapixels (wide), 1x, 12 megapixels (telephoto), 2x, 16 megapixels (ultra wide), 0.5x; 3840x2160p (4K UHD) video at 30/60 fps, 1080p (Full HD) at 30/60 fps, slow-motion 1080p at 240 fps or slow-motion 720p (HD) at 960 fps; Front: 10 megapixels, 3840x2160p (4K UHD) at 30/60 fps, 1080p (Full HD) at 30 fps
 Battery: 3,400 mAh (non-replaceable)
 Introduced Features: Ultrasonic Fingerprint Sensor, Triple Rear Cameras, Infinity-O Display, HDR10+ Video Recording, Reverse Wireless Charging (Qi-certified),Wi-fi 6

Samsung Galaxy S10+
 Display: 6.4" Dynamic AMOLED, 19:9 aspect ratio
 Resolution: 3040×1440 pixels
 Processor: Samsung Exynos 9820 or Qualcomm Snapdragon 855
 Storage: 128 / 512 GB / 1 TB (expandable)
 RAM:  8 / 12 GB
Camera: Back: 12 megapixels (wide), 1x, 12 megapixels (telephoto), 2x, 16 megapixels (ultra wide), 0.5x; 3840x2160p (4K UHD) video at 30/60 fps, 1080p (Full HD) at 30/60 fps, slow-motion 1080p at 240 fps or slow-motion 720p (HD) at 960 fps; Front: 10 megapixels (main), 8 megapixels (secondary); 3840x2160p (4K UHD) at 30/60 fps, 1080p (Full HD) at 30 fps
Battery: 4,100 mAh (non-replaceable)
 Introduced Features: Ultrasonic Fingerprint Sensor, Triple Rear Cameras, Dual Front Cameras, Infinity-O Display, HDR10+ Video Recording, Reverse Wireless Charging (Qi-certified), Wi-fi 6

Samsung Galaxy S10 5G
 Display: 6.7" Dynamic AMOLED, 19:9 aspect ratio
 Resolution: 3040×1440 pixels
 Processor: Samsung Exynos 9820 or Qualcomm Snapdragon 855
 Storage: 256 / 512 GB (non-expandable)
 RAM:  8 GB
Camera: Back: 12 megapixels (wide), 1x, 12 megapixels (telephoto), 2x, 16 megapixels (ultra wide), 0.5x, ToF (time-of-flight); 3840x2160p (4K UHD) video at 30/60 fps, 1080p (Full HD) at 30/60 fps, slow-motion 1080p at 240 fps or slow-motion 720p (HD) at 960 fps; Front: 10 megapixels (main), 8 megapixels (secondary) ToF (time-of-flight); 3840x2160p (4K UHD) at 30/60 fps, 1080p (Full HD) at 30 fps
 Battery: 4,500 mAh (non-replaceable)
 Introduced Features: Ultrasonic Fingerprint Sensor, Quad Rear Cameras, Dual Front Cameras, Infinity-O Display, HDR10+ Video Recording, Reverse Wireless Charging (Qi-certified), Wi-fi 6

Samsung Galaxy S10 Lite
 Display: 6.7" Super AMOLED, 20:9 aspect ratio
 Resolution: 2400×1080 pixels
 Processor: Qualcomm Snapdragon 855
 Storage: 128 GB (expandable)
 RAM: 6 / 8 GB
Camera: Back: 48 megapixels (wide), 1x, 12 megapixels (ultra wide), 0.5x, 5 megapixels (macro), 1x; 3840x2160p (4K UHD) video at 30/60 fps, 1080p (Full HD) at 30/60 fps or slow-motion 1080p at 240 fps; Front: 32 megapixels, 1080p (Full HD) at 30fps
 Battery: 4,500 mAh (non-replaceable)
 Introduced Features: Optical Fingerprint Sensor, Triple Rear Cameras, Infinity-O Display, HDR10+ Video Recording, 25 W Super Fast Charging, Macro Camera Lens, Wi-fi 6

Samsung Galaxy S20 

Samsung announced the Samsung Galaxy S20 series, consisting of the Samsung Galaxy S20, Samsung Galaxy S20+ and Samsung Galaxy S20 Ultra, on 11 February 2020. In October 2020, the Samsung Galaxy S20 FE was released, a mid-range variant of the S20 containing similar cameras and performance but with less functionality. Another variant is the Samsung Galaxy S20 Tactical Edition, intended for military use. The Galaxy S20 series featured 120 Hz refresh rate displays with 20:9 aspect ratio.

The S20 series are the first Samsung mobile phones with 8K video recording (7680×4320p), excluding the S20 FE.

Samsung Galaxy S20
 Display: 6.2" Dynamic AMOLED 2X 120Hz, 20:9 aspect ratio
 Resolution: 3200×1440 pixels
 Processor: Samsung Exynos 990 or Qualcomm Snapdragon 865
 Storage: 128 GB
 RAM: 8 GB (4G LTE); 12 GB (5G)
Camera: Back: 12 megapixels (wide), 1x, 64 megapixels (telephoto), 3x, 12 megapixels (ultrawide), 0.6x; 7680x4320 (8K) at 24 fps, 3840x2160p (4K UHD) video at 30/60 fps, 1080p (Full HD) at 30/60 fps, slow-motion 1080p at 240 fps or slow-motion 720p (HD) at 960 fps; Front: 10 megapixels, 3840x2160p (4K UHD) at 30/60 fps, 1080p (Full HD) at 30 fps
 Battery: 4,000 mAh
 Introduced Features: 8K Video Recording, 120 Hz refresh rate, Triple Rear Cameras, Infinity-O Display, HDR10+ Video Recording, USB 3.2, 5G Connectivity, 25 W Super Fast Charging

Samsung Galaxy S20+
 Display: 6.7" Dynamic AMOLED 2X 120Hz, 20:9 aspect ratio
 Resolution: 3200×1440 pixels
 Processor: Samsung Exynos 990 or Qualcomm Snapdragon 865
 Storage: 128 GB (4G LTE/5G); 256 GB (5G); 512 GB (5G)
 RAM: 8 GB (4G LTE); 12 GB (5G)
Camera: Back: 12 megapixels (wide), 1x, 64 megapixels (telephoto), 3x, 12 megapixels (ultrawide), 0.6x, ToF (time-of-flight); 7680x4320 (8K) at 24 fps, 3840x2160p (4K UHD) video at 30/60 fps, 1080p (Full HD) at 30/60 fps, slow-motion 1080p at 240 fps or slow-motion 720p (HD) at 960 fps; Front: 10 megapixels, 3840x2160p (4K UHD) at 30/60 fps, 1080p (Full HD) at 30 fps
 Battery: 4,500 mAh (non-replaceable)
 Introduced Features: 8K Video Recording, 120 Hz refresh rate, Quad Rear Cameras, 3D Depth Camera, Infinity-O Display, HDR10+ Video Recording, USB 3.2, 5G Connectivity, 25 W Super Fast Charging

Samsung Galaxy S20 Ultra 5G
 Display: 6.9" Dynamic AMOLED 2X 120Hz, 20:9 aspect ratio, Infinity-O Display,511 ppi,HDR10+ certified
 Resolution: 3200×1440 pixels
 Processor: Samsung Exynos 990 or Qualcomm Snapdragon 865
 Storage: 128 / 256 / 512 GB
 RAM: 12 / 16 GB
 OS: Android 10
 Water Resistance: IP68
 Dimensions: 166.9 x 76.0 x 8.8mm
 Weight: 220g
 Colors: Cosmic Black, Cosmic Gray
Camera: Back: 108 megapixels (wide), 1x, 48 megapixels (telephoto), 3x, 12 megapixels (ultrawide), 0.6x, ToF (time-of-flight); 7680x4320 (8K) at 24 fps, 3840x2160p (4K UHD) video at 30/60 fps, 1080p (Full HD) at 30/60 fps, slow-motion 1080p at 240 fps or slow-motion 720p (HD) at 960 fps; Front: 40 megapixels, 3840x2160p (4K UHD) at 30/60 fps, 1080p (Full HD) at 30 fps
 Battery: 5000mAh (typical)
 Introduced Features: 8K Video Recording, 120 Hz refresh rate, Triple Rear Cameras, 3D Depth Camera, Infinity-O Display, HDR10+ Video Recording, USB 3.2, 5G Connectivity, 45W Super Fast Charging
 Network & Connectivity: 5G- 5G Non-Standalone (NSA), Standalone (SA), Sub6 / mmWave, LTE-Enhanced 4x4 MIMO, Up to 7CA, LTE Cat.20
Up to 2.0Gbps Download / Up to 150Mbps Upload, Wi-Fi-Wi-Fi 802.11 a/b/g/n/ac/ax 2.4G+5 GHz, HE80, MIMO, 1024-QAM Up to 1.2Gbps Download / Up to 1.2Gbps Upload, Bluetooth- Bluetooth® v 5.0, ANT+, USB type-C, NFC, Location (GPS, Galileo, Glonass, BeiDou)

Samsung Galaxy S20 FE
 Display: 6.5" Super AMOLED  120Hz, 20:9 aspect ratio
 Resolution: 2400×1080 pixels
 Processor: Samsung Exynos 990 (4G) or Qualcomm Snapdragon 865 (5G)
 Storage: 256 GB
 RAM: 8 GB
Camera: Back: 12 megapixel (wide), 1x, 8 megapixel (telephoto), 3x, 12 megapixels (ultra wide), 0.6x, 3840x2160p (4K UHD) video at 30/60 fps, 1080p (Full HD) at 30/60 fps; Front: 32 megapixels, 3840x2160p (4K UHD) video at 30/60 fps, 1080p (Full HD) at 30/60 fps
 Battery: 4,500 mAh (non-replaceable)
 Introduced Features: 120 Hz refresh rate, 8MP Telephoto Camera, Triple Rear Cameras, Infinity-O Display, HDR10+ Video Recording, Wi-Fi 6, 5G Connectivity, 25W Super Fast Charging

Samsung Galaxy S21 

Samsung announced the Samsung Galaxy S21 series, consisting of the Samsung Galaxy S21 , Samsung Galaxy S21+ and Samsung Galaxy S21 Ultra, on 14 January 2021. They are the first S Series Lineup to feature 5G models only during launch. On 4 January 2022, the Samsung Galaxy S21 FE was released, a mid-range variant of the S21 containing similar cameras and performance but with lower features.

These smartphones lack the microSD expandable storage previously featured on the entire Galaxy S series except the 2015 S6, and are, for the first time in the series, not equipped with a 3.5mm audio connector (coll. "headphone jack"). On an earlier keynote, a Samsung representative mocked the lack thereof of the Apple iPhone 7 on stage.

This was the first S-series phone to get support for the "S-Pen" stylus on the S21 Ultra, which was an exclusive feature for the Note series, though the S21 Ultra lacks the Note's compartment to house the stylus inside the unit. The series also feature an adaptive refresh rate that could go from 10-120Hz. The S21 series also drops MST technology previously used for Samsung Pay which gave Galaxy phones the ability to pay without needing NFC.

Samsung Galaxy S21
 Display: 6.2" Dynamic AMOLED 2X 48-120hz (adaptive), 20:9 aspect ratio
 Resolution: 2400×1080 pixels
 Processor: Samsung Exynos 2100 or Qualcomm Snapdragon 888
 Storage: 128 / 256 GB (non-expandable)
 RAM: 8 GB
Camera: Back: 12 megapixels (wide), 1x, 64 megapixels (telephoto), 3x, 12 megapixels (ultrawide), 0.6x; 7680x4320 (8K) at 24 fps, 3840x2160p (4K UHD) video at 30/60 fps, 1080p (Full HD) at 30/60 fps, slow-motion 1080p at 240 fps or slow-motion 720p (HD) at 960 fps; Front: 10 megapixels, 3840x2160p (4K UHD) at 30/60 fps, 1080p (Full HD) at 30 fps
 Battery: 4000 mAh (non-replaceable)

Samsung Galaxy S21+
 Display: 6.7" Dynamic AMOLED 2X 48-120Hz (adaptive), 20:9 aspect ratio
 Resolution: 2400×1080 pixels
 Processor: Samsung Exynos 2100 or Qualcomm Snapdragon 888
 Storage: 128 / 256 GB (non-expandable)
 RAM: 8 GB
Camera: Back: 12 megapixels (wide), 1x, 64 megapixels (telephoto), 3x, 12 megapixels (ultrawide), 0.6x; 7680x4320 (8K) at 24 fps, 3840x2160p (4K UHD) video at 30/60 fps, 1080p (Full HD) at 30/60 fps, slow-motion 1080p at 240 fps or slow-motion 720p (HD) at 960 fps; Front: 10 megapixels, 3840x2160p (4K UHD) at 30/60 fps, 1080p (Full HD) at 30 fps
 Battery: 4800 mAh (non-replaceable)

Samsung Galaxy S21 Ultra
 Display: 6.8" Dynamic AMOLED 2X 10-120Hz (adaptive), 20:9 aspect ratio
 Resolution: 3200×1440 pixels
 Processor: Samsung Exynos 2100 or Qualcomm Snapdragon 888
 Storage: 128 / 256 / 512 GB (non-expandable)
 RAM: 12 / 16 GB
Camera: Back: 108 megapixels (wide), 1x, 10 megapixels (telephoto), 3x, 10 megapixels (telephoto), 10x, 12 megapixels (ultra wide), 0.6x, Laser AF (auto-focus); 7680x4320 (8K) at 24 fps, 3840x2160p (4K UHD) video at 30/60 fps, 1080p (Full HD) at 30/60 fps, slow-motion 1080p at 240 fps or slow-motion 720p (HD) at 960 fps; Front: 40 megapixels, 3840x2160p (4K UHD) at 30/60 fps, 1080p (Full HD) at 30 fps
 Battery: 5000 mAh (non-replaceable)

Samsung Galaxy S21 FE
 Display: 6.4" Dynamic AMOLED 2X 60/120Hz, 20:9 aspect ratio
 Resolution: 2340×1080 pixels
 Processor: Samsung Exynos 2100 or Qualcomm Snapdragon 888
 Storage: 128 / 256 GB (non-expandable)
 RAM: 6 / 8 GB
Camera: Back: 12 megapixel (wide), 1x, 8 megapixel (telephoto), 3x, 12 megapixels (ultra wide), 0.6x, 3840x2160p (4K UHD) video at 30/60 fps, 1080p (Full HD) at 30/60 fps, slow-motion 1080p at 240 fps or slow-motion 720p (HD) at 960 fps; Front: 32 megapixels, 3840x2160p (4K UHD) video at 30/60 fps, 1080p (Full HD) at 30/60 fps
 Battery: 4500 mAh (non-replaceable)

Samsung Galaxy S22 

Samsung announced the Samsung Galaxy S22 series, consisting of the Samsung Galaxy S22, Samsung Galaxy S22+ and Samsung Galaxy S22 Ultra, on 9 February 2022. The Galaxy S22 series changed the aspect ratio once again to 19.5:9. The Galaxy S22 and S22+ added glass backs which was lacking on the S21 and S21+, the frames were also flattened similar to the iPhone 12 series. The Galaxy S22 Ultra had a huge design change which gave it a more similar look to the Galaxy Note20 Ultra rather than the Galaxy S21 Ultra. The S22 Ultra saw the introduction of the built in S Pen which was not present on the Galaxy S21 Ultra. The S22 Ultra also changed the adaptiveness of the refresh rate from 10-120Hz to 1-120Hz. Both the S22+ and S22 Ultra got upgrades in the charging speed from 25 watts to 45 watts. The S22+ and S22 Ultra also got improvements on the display brightness to 1750 nits. Armor Aluminum and Gorilla Glass Victus+ also saw a new introduction to the S22 series.

Samsung Galaxy S22
 Display: 6.1" Dynamic AMOLED 2X 10-120Hz (adaptive), 19.5:9 aspect ratio
 Resolution: 2340×1080 pixels
 Processor: Samsung Exynos 2200 or Qualcomm Snapdragon 8 Gen 1
 Storage: 128 / 256 GB (non-expandable)
 RAM: 8 GB
 Camera: Rear: 50 megapixels (wide), 1x, 10 megapixels (telephoto), 3x, 12 megapixels (ultrawide), 0.6x; 7680x4320 (8K) at 24 fps, 3840x2160p (4K UHD) video at 30/60 fps, 1080p (Full HD) at 30/60 fps, slow-motion 1080p at 240 fps or slow-motion 720p (HD) at 960 fps; Front: 10 megapixels, 3840x2160p (4K UHD) at 30/60 fps, 1080p (Full HD) at 30 fps
 Battery: 3700 mAh (non-replaceable)

Samsung Galaxy S22+
 Display: 6.6" Dynamic AMOLED 2X 10-120Hz (adaptive), 19.5:9 aspect ratio
 Resolution: 2340×1080 pixels
 Processor: Samsung Exynos 2200 or Qualcomm Snapdragon 8 Gen 1
 Storage: 128 / 256 GB (non-expandable)
 RAM: 8 GB
 Camera: Rear: 50 megapixels (wide), 1x, 10 megapixels (telephoto), 3x, 12 megapixels (ultrawide), 0.6x; 7680x4320 (8K) at 24 fps, 3840x2160p (4K UHD) video at 30/60 fps, 1080p (Full HD) at 30/60 fps, slow-motion 1080p at 240 fps or slow-motion 720p (HD) at 960 fps; Front: 10 megapixels, 3840x2160p (4K UHD) at 30/60 fps, 1080p (Full HD) at 30 fps
 Battery: 4500 mAh (non-replaceable)

Samsung Galaxy S22 Ultra
 Display: 17.31cm (6.8") full rectangle / 17.25cm (6.8") rounded corners Dynamic AMOLED 2X 1-120Hz (adaptive), 19.3:9 aspect ratio, Color Depth: 16M
 OS: Android
 Resolution: 3088×1440 pixels (Quad HD+)
 Processor: Samsung Exynos 2200 or Qualcomm Snapdragon 8 Gen 1 CPU Speed: 2.99GHz,2.4GHz, 1.7GHz CPU Type: Octa-Core
 Storage: 128 / 256 / 512 GB / 1 TB (non-expandable)
 RAM: 8 / 12 GB
 Colours: Phantom White, Phantom Black, Burgundy, Green
 S Pen Support: Yes
 Number of SIM: Dual-SIM, SIM Slot Type: SIM 1 + SIM 2 or Embedded SIM
 Camera: Back: 108 megapixels (wide), 1x, 10 megapixels (telephoto), 3x, 10 megapixels (telephoto), 10x, 12 megapixels (ultra wide), 0.6x, Laser AF (auto-focus); 7680x4320 (8K) at 24 fps, 3840x2160p (4K UHD) video at 30/60 fps, 1080p (Full HD) at 30/60 fps, slow-motion 1080p at 240 fps or slow-motion 720p (HD) at 960 fps; Front: 40 megapixels, 3840x2160p (4K UHD) at 30/60 fps, 1080p (Full HD) at 30 fps
 Battery: 5000 mAh (non-replaceable)

Samsung Galaxy S23 

Samsung announced the Samsung Galaxy S23 series, consisting of the Samsung Galaxy S23, Samsung Galaxy S23+ and Samsung Galaxy S23 Ultra, on 1 February 2023.

Samsung Galaxy S23 Ultra

Display: Dynamic AMOLED 2X, 120Hz, HDR10+, 1200 nits (HBM), 1750 nits (peak)
 Resolution: 1440 x 3088 pixels (~500 ppi density)
 Processor: Qualcomm SM8550-AC Snapdragon 8 Gen 2 (4 nm)
 Storage: 256GB, 256GB, 512GB, 1TB
 RAM: 8/ 12 GB
Camera: Back: 200 MP, f/1.7, 24mm (wide), 1/1.3", 0.6µm, multi-directional PDAF, Laser AF, OIS 10 MP, f/4.9, 230mm (periscope telephoto), 1/3.52", 1.12µm, Dual Pixel PDAF, OIS, 10x optical zoom 10 MP, f/2.4, 70mm (telephoto), 1/3.52", 1.12µm, Dual Pixel PDAF, OIS, 3x optical zoom 12 MP, f/2.2, 13mm, 120˚ (ultrawide), 1/2.55", 1.4µm, Dual Pixel PDAF, Super Steady video;                                         Front: 12 MP, f/2.2, 26mm (wide), Dual Pixel PDAF
 Battery: Li-Ion 5000 mAh, (non-replaceable)

One of the key features of the Samsung Galaxy S23 Ultra is its display. It features a 6.8-inch Dynamic AMOLED display with a resolution of 3200 x 1440 pixels. The screen is HDR10+ certified, which means it can produce vibrant colors and sharp contrast. The device also has a 120Hz refresh rate, which makes scrolling and swiping feel smoother and more responsive.

Another notable feature of the Samsung Galaxy S23 Ultra is its camera system. The device has a quad-camera setup at the back, which includes a 108MP primary sensor, a 12MP ultra-wide sensor, a 10MP telephoto sensor, and a 5MP macro sensor. This setup allows users to capture stunning photos and videos, regardless of the lighting conditions.

The Samsung Galaxy S23 Ultra is also packed with powerful hardware. It is powered by the Qualcomm Snapdragon 895 processor, which is expected to be one of the fastest processors in the market. The device also has 16GB of RAM and up to 1TB of internal storage, which should be more than enough for most users.

One of the unique features of the Samsung Galaxy S23 Ultra is its S Pen support. This means users can use the device with a stylus, which makes it easier to take notes, draw, and navigate through the device's interface. This is a feature that was previously only available on the Samsung Galaxy Note series.

Tablets

Samsung Galaxy Tab S 

the first generation Galaxy Tab, The Samsung Galaxy Tab S was announced on 12 June 2014. The tablet comes in two sizes, a 8.4-inch version and a 10.5-inch version.

 Display: 8.4" Super AMOLED display with 1600x2560 pixel resolution (8.4-inch version); 10.5" Super AMOLED display with 1600x2560 pixel resolution (10.5-inch version)
 Processor: Qualcomm Snapdragon 800 (both versions), Samsung Exynos 5 Octa 5420 (both versions), or Samsung Exynos 5 Octa 5433 (10.5-inch version)
 Storage: 16 / 32 GB (expandable)
 RAM: 3 GB

Samsung Galaxy Tab S2 

Samsung announced the Galaxy Tab S2 series on 20 July 2015. It comes in two sizes, an 8.0-inch version and a 9.7-inch version.

 Display: 8.0" Super AMOLED display with 1536x2048 pixel resolution (8.0-inch version); 9.7" Super AMOLED display with 1536x2048 pixel resolution (9.7-inch version)
 Storage: 32 or 64 GB (expandable)

Samsung Galaxy Tab S3 

Samsung announced the Galaxy Tab S3 on 26 February 2017. Unlike the Galaxy Tab S and Galaxy Tab S2, the Galaxy Tab S3 only comes in one size, a 9.7-inch model.

 Display: 9.7" Super AMOLED display with 1536x2048 pixel resolution
 Processor: Qualcomm Snapdragon 820
 Storage: 32 / 128 GB (expandable)
 RAM: 4 GB
 Battery: 6000 mAh (non-replaceable)

Samsung Galaxy Tab S4 

The Galaxy Tab S4 was announced on 1 August 2018. It features a larger 10.5-inch display with slimmer bezels, and facial and iris scanning.

 Display: 10.5-inch 2560x1600 Super AMOLED
 Processor: Qualcomm Snapdragon 835
 Storage: 64 / 256 GB (expandable up to 400 GB)
 Memory: 4 GB
 Battery: 7300 mAh (non-replaceable)

Samsung Galaxy Tab S5e 

Samsung announced the Galaxy Tab S5e on 15 February 2019.

 Display: 10.5-inch 2560x1600 Super AMOLED
 Processor: Qualcomm Snapdragon 670
 Storage: 64 / 128 GB (expandable up to 512 GB)
 RAM: 4 / 6 GB
 Battery: 7040 mAh (non-replaceable)

Samsung Galaxy Tab S6 

The Samsung Galaxy Tab S6 was announced on 31 July 2019.

Display: 10.5-inch 2560x1600 Super AMOLED
 Processor: Qualcomm Snapdragon 855
 Storage: 128 / 256 GB (expandable up to 512 GB)
 RAM: 6 / 8 GB
 Battery: 7,040 mAh (non-replaceable)
Rear Camera: 13 MP wide + 5 MP ultra-wide
Front Camera: 8 MP
Dimensions: 244.5 × 159.5 × 5.7 mm
Weight: 420 grams

Samsung Galaxy Tab S6 Lite 
The Samsung Galaxy Tab S6 Lite was announced on 16 April 2020.

 Display: 10.4-inch 2000x1200 TFT LCD
 Processor: Exynos 9611
 Storage: 64 / 128 GB (expandable up to 1 TB)
 RAM: 4 GB
 Battery: 7,040 mAh (non-replaceable)
 Rear Camera: 8 MP
 Front Camera: 5 MP
 Dimensions: 244.5 × 154.3 × 7.0mm
 Weight: 465 grams

Samsung Galaxy Tab S7 

The Galaxy Tab S7 and Galaxy Tab S7+ were announced on 5 August 2020.

Display: 11-inch 2560 × 1600 120Hz TFT LCD
Processor: Qualcomm Snapdragon 865+
Storage: 128 / 256 / 512 GB (expandable)
RAM: 6 / 8 GB
Battery: 8000 mAh (Non Removable)
Rear Camera: 13+5 MP
Front Camera: 8 MP
Dimensions: 253.8 × 165.3 × 6.3mm
Speaker: Quad Stereo Speakers, tuned by AKG
Audio Jack: No
Weight: 498 grams
Samsung Galaxy Tab S7+
Display: 12.4-inch 2800 × 1752 120Hz Super AMOLED
Processor: Qualcomm Snapdragon 865+
Storage: 128 / 256 / 512 GB (expandable)
RAM: 6 / 8 GB
Battery: 10090 mAh (Non Removable)
Rear Camera: 13+5 MP
Front Camera: 8 MP
Dimensions: 285 × 185 × 5.7mm
Speaker: Quad Stereo Speakers, tuned by AKG
Headphone Jack: No
Weight: 575 grams

 Samsung Galaxy Tab S7 FE 

The Galaxy Tab S7 FE was announced on 25 May 2021.

 Display: 12.4-inch 2560 × 1600 TFT LCD
 Processor: Qualcomm Snapdragon 778G (Wi-Fi); 750G (5G)
 Storage: 64 / 128 / 256 GB (expandable)
 RAM: 6 / 8 GB
 Battery: 10090 mAh (Non Removable)
 Rear Camera: 8MP
 Front Camera: 5MP
 Dimensions: 284.8 × 185 × 6.3mm
 Speaker: Dual Stereo Speakers
 Headphone Jack: No
 Weight: 575 grams

Samsung Galaxy Tab S8 

The Galaxy Tab S8 series was announced on 9 February 2022.

 Samsung Galaxy Tab S8

Display: 11-inch 2560 × 1600 120Hz TFT LCD
Processor: Qualcomm Snapdragon 8 Gen 1
Storage: 128 / 256 GB (expandable)
RAM: 8 / 12 GB
Battery: 8000 mAh (Non-Removable)
Charging: 45W Fast Charging
Rear Camera: 13 + 6 MP
Front Camera: 12 MP
Dimensions: 253.8 × 165.3 × 6.3 mm
Weight: 503 g
Speaker: Quad Stereo Speakers, tuned by AKG
 Samsung Galaxy Tab S8+

Display: 12.4-inch 2800 × 1752 120Hz Super AMOLED
Processor: Qualcomm Snapdragon 8 Gen 1
Storage: 128 / 256 GB (expandable)
RAM: 8 / 12 GB
Battery: 10090 mAh (Non-Removable)
Charging: 45W Fast Charging
Rear Camera: 13 + 6 MP
Front Camera: 12 MP
Dimensions: 285 × 185 × 5.7 mm
Weight: 567 g
Speaker: Quad Stereo Speakers, tuned by AKG

 Samsung Galaxy Tab S8 Ultra 5G

Display: 14.6-inch (369.9mm) 2960 x 1848 (WQXGA+) 120Hz Super AMOLED 16M(Colour Depth)
Processor: Qualcomm Snapdragon 8 Gen 1
CPU Type: Octa Core
CPU Speed: 2.99GHz, 2.4GHz, 1.7GHz
OS: Android
Sensors: Accelerometer, Fingerprint Sensor, Gyro Sensor, Geomagnetic Sensor, Hall Sensor, Light Sensor
S Pen Support: Yes (Gesture/Remote Control)
Storage: 128 / 256 / 512 GB (expandable)
RAM: 8 / 12 / 16 GB
Battery: 11200 mAh (Non-Removable)
Charging: 45W Fast Charging
Rear Camera: 13 + 6 MP
Front Camera: 2× 12 MP
Dimensions: 326.4 × 208.6 × 5.5 mm
Weight: 728 g
Speaker: Quad Stereo Speakers, tuned by AKG

See also 
 Samsung Galaxy
 Samsung Ativ S
Samsung Galaxy Note Series
 Samsung Galaxy A series
 Comparison of Samsung Galaxy S smartphones

References

External links 

[]
Galaxy S Series
Galaxy S Series
Android (operating system) devices
Samsung mobile series
Line of flagship smartphones